ShoreTel, Inc. was a telecommunications vendor providing unified communications for business. In 2017, the company was acquired by Mitel.

History
In September 1996, ShoreTel was co-founded as Shoreline Teleworks by Edwin J. Basart and Mike Harrigan, both of whom were co-founders of Network Computing Devices.

In 1998, the company shipped its first products.

In April 2004, the company changed its name to ShoreTel.

On July 3, 2007, the company became a public company via an initial public offering.

On October 21, 2010, the company announced the acquisition of Agito Networks for approximately $11.4 million.

In 2012, the company acquired M5 Networks, based in New York City, for $146 million.

In August 2013, Don Joos became president and chief executive. He had joined ShoreTel in April 2011 from Avaya.

In August 2015, the company launched Connect Common UC Platform.
 
In January 2016, The company acquired Corvisa to provide SIP trunking and additional third-party application integration.
 
In February 2016, ShoreTel Connect Hybrid Sites was launched, a hybrid offering of on-premises and cloud services.

In August 2016, the company began looking into a sale of the company.

In September 2017, the company was acquired by Mitel for $530 million.

References

1996 establishments in the United States
2007 initial public offerings
2017 mergers and acquisitions
Telecommunications companies established in 1996
Defunct telecommunications companies of the United States